Maalai Nerathu Mayakkam is a 2016 Tamil-language romantic drama film directed by Gitanjali Selvaraghavan and written by her husband Selvaraghavan. Featuring newcomers Balakrishna Kola and Wamiqa Gabbi. The film is produced by Kola Bhaskar and has music composed by Amrit. Having had several false starts since 2006, the film released on 1 January 2016 to positive reviews. The film was dubbed and released in Telugu as Nannu Vadili Neevu Polevule.

Plot
The movie opens with Manoja (Wamiqa Gabbi) suffering from insomnia. Her ex-boyfriend Tarun (Sharran Kumar) tries to propose to her, after wishing her on her birthday. She genuinely refused his proposal. She moves to her room and looks in her photo gallery, where she sees the birthday celebration pictures when she had celebrated with her husband.

The plot moves a few years before, where Manoja has been refused by her boyfriend Tarun. Her reason for rejecting the relationship is because she has not dated him close enough and his thoughts are primarily about sex. Later, he reveals that he is moving away from her and has a crush on Reshma.

On the other side, Prabhu (Balakrishna Kola) lives with his parents. His parents were trying to get him married due to his lazy appearance, but he is rejected. Manoja's mother (Kalyani Natarajan), who is suffering from cancer, compels Manoja, and she agrees to get married.

After Prabhu and Manoja get married, Prabhu tries to impress Manoja but fails. One day, Prabhu takes Manoja to a restaurant, where he meets Manoja's ex-boyfriend, causing him to suspect Manoja as to whether she had a sexual relationship with her ex-boyfriend, and he argues with Manoja. After he realises Manoja's disciplined character, he apologizes. Manoja too apologizes, and both of them start dating as friends.

After three years passed, when Prabhu and Manoja are about to celebrate their second wedding anniversary, Prabhu invites his friends to their celebration. His friends refuse to come and give him an idea to trick Manoja into bed with him. Prabhu tries this out and gets her drunk. He tries to seduce her when dancing, but when this fails and Manoja refuses, Prabhu forcibly rapes her. After the ordeal, Manoja attempts suicide by slashing her wrist multiple times. The now sober Prabhu admits her to a hospital.

After the recovery, Manoja applies for a divorce, and they start living separately, but Prabhu is still in love with Manoja. Now, the plot moves to the present, where four years have passed. Prabhu meets Manoja again. She calls Tarun again and requests him to propose to her. Tarun wants to have sex first, so he takes Manoja to Munnar. Prabhu and his Facebook friend Kamini (Parvathy Nair) also move to the same place where he tries to confess his love to Manoja.

Manoja refuses to have sex with Tarun and gets thrown out. Prabhu tries to convince her of his love, to which Manoja replies that she too loves Prabhu but hates him because he raped her. Prabhu gives a knife to Manoja asking her to kill him, to which Manoja refuses. At last, Prabhu rips himself with the knife, hoping to satisfy Manoja. Manoja starts crying thinking Prabhu to be dead, but she hears his heartbeat and takes him to the hospital, where Prabhu then recovers. Manoja and Prabhu start living together happily. The film ends with a tagline "A true love is made up in heaven".

In a post-credits scene, Manoja cooks food for Prabhu. Although the food tastes bad, Prabhu asks Manoja to bring some more. After Manoja moves to the kitchen, Prabhu laments to the audience as to how he can eat such bad food all his life.

Cast
Balakrishna Kola as Prabhu
Wamiqa Gabbi as Manoja
Azhagam Perumal as Prabhu's father
Kalyani Natarajan as Manoja's mother
Sharran Kumar as Tarun
Naveen George Thomas as Prabhu's friend
Gokul Anand as Manas
Parvathy Nair as Kamini (guest appearance)
Ajay Rathnam as the judge (guest appearance)

Production
After the release of Pudhupettai, Selvaraghavan set up a production company, White Elephants, along with Yuvan Shankar Raja and Arvind Krishna. He announced the team's first project, Idhu Maalai Nerathu Mayakkam, which began filming in November 2006. The team shot scenes with Karthi, whose debut film, Paruthiveeran, was awaiting release, and Sandhya. The film was stalled, in early 2007, due to Arvind Krishna's decision to leave White Elephants. As a result, the project was eventually shelved.

Midway through the production of Aayirathil Oruvan, Selvaraghavan then relaunched Idhu Maalai Nerathu Mayakkam in November 2008 and filming started with a new cast of Dhanush and Andrea Jeremiah in the leading roles. Ramji and G. V. Prakash Kumar had taken over as the cinematographer and music director respectively. The film was described to be a "quick project" with Selvaraghavan and Dhanush's sister, Vimalageetha taking up the production reins. However, filming was subsequently stalled for unknown reasons in February 2009. In August 2009, the film was launched again for the third time with a first schedule planned in Hyderabad and Selvaraghavan taking over exclusively as producer. However the film was yet again abandoned in October 2009, and he began work on another project, Maruvan, with the lead actors instead.

The film was relaunched in mid 2014 with Selvaraghavan's wife, Gitanjali, announced as the director of the script. Production began in August 2014 with newcomers Balakrishna Kola and Wamiqa Gabbi, while the film was announced to be produced by Balakrishna's father, editor Kola Bhaskar. Further newcomers Amrit and Sridhar were signed on as the film's music composer and cinematographer respectively. The film's first look poster was released in April 2015, with a teaser released thereafter in September 2015. Parvathy Nair shot for a small role in the film during late 2015, featuring in the title song and a few scenes. She revealed that the team were looking for a more established actress, but her immediate availability prompted the team to sign her for the role.

Soundtrack

Debutant Amrit composed the songs and wrote the lyric of the songs alongside Vivek. Think Music released the album on 8 October 2015.

Release
The first look teaser was released on 25 September 2015 contains 50 seconds of running, followed by second teaser was released on 27 November with 1minute 27seconds runtime. The film was given an "A" certificate by the Indian Censor Board. The film was released worldwide on 1 January 2016. Sarakka Video Song was released officially on 30 December on YouTube by Think Music.

Critical reception
The movie received generally positive reviews from critics. Writing for The Hindu, Sudhir Srinivasan said "Gitanjali opens the film with a line that goes, "It's difficult to explain some love stories. Well, perhaps if they were really love stories, they could be explained." Behindwoods rated the film 2.5 out of 5 and wrote, "A watchable, bold, vintage Selvaraghavan story about two contrasting individuals, you wish had more consistent screenplay". Rediff rated the film 2.5 out of 5 and wrote "Gitanjali Selvaraghavan’s Maalai Nerathu Mayakkam is a far cry from your regular love stories and their phony over-top-characters, yet as you leave the theater, you feel strangely untouched by the director’s attempt at an emotional assault".

References

External links

2016 films
2010s Tamil-language films
Films about women in India
Indian romantic drama films
2016 directorial debut films
2016 romantic drama films